Pomaderris queenslandica, commonly known as scant pomaderris, is a species of flowering plant in the family Rhamnaceae and is endemic to eastern Australia. It is a shrub with woolly-hairy stems, egg-shaped to narrowly elliptic leaves, and panicles of creamy-yellow flowers.

Description
The upper surface of the leaves is glabrous and the lower surface is covered with whitish, woolly hairs. The sepals, floral cup and fruit are covered with long, silvery, and woolly, star-shaped hairs. Flowering occurs in spring and summer.

Taxonomy
Pomaderris queenslandica was first formally described in 1951 by Cyril Tenison White in The Queensland Naturalist from specimens he collected at Back Creek, near Canungra in 1931.

Distribution and habitat
Scant pomaderris grows in moist forest or the understorey of sheltered woodland in south-eastern Queensland and in scattered locations on the north coast and Northern Tablelands of north-eastern New South Wales.

Conservation status
This pomaderris is listed as of "least concern" under the Queensland Government Nature Conservation Act 1992 but as "endangered" in New South Wales under the Biodiversity Conservation Act 2016.

References

Flora of New South Wales
Flora of Queensland
Plants described in 1951
queenslandica
Taxa named by Cyril Tenison White